Phil Dunham (1885 - 1972) was an American actor and screenwriter.

Biography
Born in London, England, Dunham had a career that spanned silent films and "talkies". His screenplays include several films with African American casts.

He had leading roles in Cameo Comedies. He died in Los Angeles, California.

Partial filmography

Actor
 The Heart of the Hills (1914) as Dave's Brother
 The Romance of Tarzan (1918) as Englishman
 Good Night, Nurse (1920)
 Two Minutes to Go (1921) as Professor of Spanish (as Phillip Dunham)
 The Deuce of Spades (1922)
 The Barnstormer (1922) as Stage Carpenter
 Alias Julius Caesar (1922), as Billy's Valet
 The Dangerous Maid (1923) as Private Stich
 The Fighting Parson (1933) 
 Down to Their Last Yacht (1934) 
 Aces Wild (1936), as Anson
 I'll Name the Murderer (1936)
 Ghost Town (1936) as Abe Rankin
 Hair-Trigger Casey (1936) as Abner
 Gun Grit (1936) as Henchman
 Idaho Kid (1936) as Tumblebug 
 Romance Rides the Range (1936) as Doctor
 Cavalcade of the West (1936) as Reporter
 Aces Wild (1936)
 Beware of Ladies (1936) as J. Robert Slank
 Feud of the West (1936)
 Navy Spy (1937) as Dr. Matthews
 Trailin' Trouble (1937) as Nester
 Bank Alarm (1937) as Leon Curtis - Bank Clerk (as Philip Dunham)
 Our Leading Citizen (1939) as Janitor
 Westbound Stage (1939) as Jefferson Wells
 West of Pinto Basin (1940) as Summers
 Thundering Hoofs (1942) as Clem, a Telegrapher
 Code of the Outlaw (1942) as Boyle
 Swing, Cowboy, Swing (1946) as Fargo Agent

Writer
 Rainbow Ranch (1933), co-writer
 Stormy Trails (1936)
 Fury Below (1936)
 I'll Name the Murderer (1936), co-writer
 Special Agent K-7 (1937), co-writer
 The Duke is Tops (1938)
 Gang Smashers (1938), co-wrote screenplay adaptation
 Life Goes On (1938)
 Two Gun Troubador (1939), co-writer
 Ridin' the Trail (1940)

References

External links

1972 deaths
20th-century American male actors
American male film actors
American screenwriters
British emigrants to the United States